Maria João Espírito Santo Bustorff Silva GOM is a Portuguese restoration specialist, philanthropist and  former politician.

Biography
Maria João Espírito Santo Bustorff was born on 13 August, 1950 in Lisbon, Portugal to António Sérgio Carneiro Bustorff Silva and Ana Maria da Anunciação de Fátima de Morais Sarmento Cohen do Espírito Santo Silva. In 1973, she obtained a degree in social and political sciences from the Universidade Técnica de Lisboa and then taught sociology at the Universidade Nova de Lisboa. All are involved in preservation of crafts and restoration of furniture and furnishings.

Bustorff expanded the work of the Foundation, which until she joined had been limited to Portugal, into Brazil, hoping to protect and conserve Portuguese heritage throughout the world. One of her first projects there was restoration of the Franciscan Monastery of St. Anthony Church in Igarassu, Pernambuco. The project earned the backing of the European Union's cultural division to protect heritage and at the time was the only organization trying to protect the Baroque art heritage in Latin America. For her work, in 1998 she was awarded the National Cross of the South from Brazil and a few months later received the Order of Merit from Portugal as Grand Officer.  

She continued working in Brazil and expanded into the states of Bahia, Minas Gerais, Pará, Pernambuco, Rio de Janeiro and São Paulo, working closely with the Ministry of Culture of Brazil to preserve Brazil's historical and artistic heritage.

In July 2004, Bustorff was chosen by Pedro Santana Lopes to become Minister of Culture in his government. Her choice was widely considered as a surprise. The government would resign some months later, and after leaving her post she joined the Board of Arqueonautas Worldwide.

Orders of Merit
10 March 1998, National Cross of the South, Brazil
9 June, 1998, Grand Officer of the Order of Merit, Portugal
3 January, 2001, Grand Cross of the Order of Cultural Merit, Brazil
30 December, 2004, Collar of the Centennial of São Paulo, Brazil
31 January, 2005, Grand Cross of Merit, Italy
12 December, 2012, Grand official of the  National Cross of the South, Brazil

References

Sources

1950 births
Living people
People from Lisbon
Culture ministers of Portugal
Technical University of Lisbon alumni
Academic staff of NOVA University Lisbon
Portuguese philanthropists
Order of Merit (Portugal)
Grand Cross of the Order of Civil Merit